"Mission to Montreal" is the fifth episode of the second series of the 1960s cult British spy-fi television series The Avengers, starring Patrick Macnee. It was first broadcast by ABC on 27 October 1962. The episode was directed by Don Leaver and written by Lester Powell.

Plot
Steed and Dr. King are assigned a mission to recover a microfilm containing the stolen plans of a missile early warning system. Shipboard, they meet knives and a drunken film star.

Cast
 Patrick Macnee as John Steed
 Jon Rollason as Dr. Martin King
 Patricia English as Carla Berotti  
 Iris Russell as Sheila Dowson
 Mark Eden as Alec Nicholson 
 Gillian Muir  as Judy
 Harold Berens as Film Director
 Alan Curtis as A.G. Brand    
 John Bennett as Guido Marson  
 Gerald Sim as Budge   
 Eric McCain as Pearson
 Alan Casley as Barman
 John Frawley as Passenger
 Malcolm Taylor as Reporter 
 Terence Woodfield as Reporter 
 Leslie Pitt  as Reporter 
 Pamela Ann Davy as Peggy 
 William Buck as Photographer 
 Angela Thorne as Receptionist 
 Peter Mackriel as Steward 
 William Swan  as Steward

Story Notes
Mission to Montreal is notable for introducing Dr. Martin King (Jon Rolloason), a thinly disguised reworked character of Dr. David Keel. This story marks the first of King's three appearances in the series. The other Keel episodes heldover and rewritten for series 2 are The Sell-Out and Dead on Course.

References

External links

Episode overview on The Avengers Forever! website

The Avengers (season 2) episodes
1962 British television episodes